Norman Roye (September 6, 1935 – January 19, 1956) was an American serial killer and rapist who murdered three women in the Harlem neighborhood of Upper Manhattan over the winter and spring of 1954. He was sentenced to death in 1955 and executed at Sing Sing in January 1956.

Early life 
Roye was born on September 6, 1935. When he was eight years old, both of his parents died of unspecified causes; afterwards he and his sister were raised by his grandmother. Around his junior year of high school Roye began a habit of committing petty crimes, which eventually landed him in a state reformatory in November 1951. During his incarceration, he began to become interested in baseball, and after his release successfully made it into  his school's baseball team. He even said he aspired to one day make it into the major leagues. Roye would state that around this time he began to commit purse snatches and thefts from parked trucks in New York City.

Murders 
On January 2, 1954, Roye was prowling through an apartment complex in Harlem when he began stalking Margaret Branch, 40, who was walking home alone. Roye waited until Branch was nearing her room when he attacked her. He choked and robbed her, then carried her to the fifth-floor and he raped her. Afterwards he strangled her to death with one of her Christmas stockings. Over four months later, on May 28, Roye found himself inside a subway station, when he began stalking 25-year-old Kathleen Stewart through the station all the way back to her Harlem river apartment. Once there, he confronted and threatened her, claiming he had a knife even though he did not. He forced her into the parking lot, raped her twice, then tied her hands behind her back and strangled her to death.

On June 7, 1954, Roye attacked 66-year-old Isadora Goomes as she entered her apartment building. Roye threw a noose around her neck and demanded money, and Goomes handed Roye five pennies, but not feeling satisfied Roye tightened the noose, resulting in Goomes dying of asphyxiation. With the five pennies Goomes had given him, Roye bought a box of crackers. He later ate the crackers while observing police examine Goomes body. Detectives took notice of Roye spying on them and arrested him.

Trial 
Roye confessed to each of the murders, describing in detail how he had committed them. According to Roye's confession, he said he did not intend to kill Goomes, but claimed when he tightened the noose she, "just died on me."

Two days before Roye's arrest, a man named John Francis Roche was arrested after he was spotted driving erratically, and once in custody confessed to six murders which occurred in the Yorkvile neighborhood on Manhattan's east side. The two cases, which occurred in close proximity to one another, were compared to each other by the press and the media. In a jailhouse interview with his sister, Roye denied making a confession, stating, "they found my pants in the hallway." While awaiting trial, Roye was not eligible for bond. On February 4, 1955, Roye was convicted of first degree murder in the death of Goomes. The jury did not recommend mercy, making a death sentence mandatory. Roye was formally sentenced to death on March 5, 1955.

Execution 
While awaiting execution, Roye received no visitors, but turned to religion. After 10-months on death row, on January 19, 1956, Roye was executed by electric chair at Sing Sing Prison. His last meal consisted of roast chicken and steak. Roye had no last words.

See also 
 John Francis Roche
 Capital punishment in New York (state)
 List of people executed in New York
 List of serial killers in the United States

References 

1935 births
1956 deaths
20th-century American criminals
20th-century executions by New York (state)
American male criminals
American people convicted of murder
American rapists
Crime in New York (state)
Criminals from New York (state)
Executed American serial killers
Executed people from New York (state)
Male serial killers
People convicted of murder by New York (state)
People executed by New York (state) by electric chair
People executed for murder